Frederick James Bowley (20 February 1909 – October 1994) was an English first-class cricketer, who played for Leicestershire.

Family Life
He was born at Ratby, Leicestershire in 1909 to Frederick James and Emma Bowley. His brother Herrick Bowley born in 1911, also played for Leicestershire in the 1930s.

Cricket career
Bowley played 24 County Championship matches for Leicestershire, three in 1930, ten in 1931 and eleven in 1937. He batted right-handed and bowled slow left-arm orthodox.

His bowling was the better element of his play in an otherwise undistinguished career, taking 5 wickets @41.80 in 1930, 18 @31.16 in 1931, and 17 @54.05 in 1937.

Fred Bowley rarely reached double figures with the bat, his top score of 25 coming in a 1937 match against Sussex when he was bowled by Maurice Tate having completed a century partnership with Stuart Dempster.

Later life and death
At the time World War Two broke out he was a threshing machine operator and lived with his parents in Blaby, Leicestershire

He died in October 1994 at Leicester.

References

1909 births
1994 deaths
English cricketers
People from Ratby
Cricketers from Leicestershire